The 1984 Formula Ford Driver to Europe Series was an Australian motor racing competition open to Formula Ford racing cars. It was the 15th Australian Formula Ford Series.

The series was won by Ron Barnacle driving a Royale RP31.

Calendar
The series was contested over eight rounds with one race per round.

Points system
Points were awarded on a 20-15-12-10-8-6-4-3-2-1 basis for the first ten positions at each round.

Series standings

References

Formula Ford Driver to Europe Series
Australian Formula Ford Series